Macetes is a genus of leaf beetles in the subfamily Eumolpinae. It is distributed in Southeast Africa, from Lake Tanganyika to the Eastern Cape province in South Africa.

Species
Species include:
 Macetes albicans Chapuis, 1874
 Macetes clypeata Jacoby, 1900
 Macetes ornatipennis Jacoby, 1901
 Macetes puberula (Marshall, 1865)
 Macetes pusilla Jacoby, 1904
 Macetes rugicollis Jacoby, 1904
 Macetes thoracica Jacoby, 1903
 Macetes variegata Jacoby, 1901

References

Eumolpinae
Chrysomelidae genera
Beetles of Africa
Taxa named by Félicien Chapuis